The Book of Song (Sòng Shū) is a historical text of the Liu Song Dynasty of the Southern Dynasties of China.  It covers history from 420 to 479, and is one of the Twenty-Four Histories, a traditional collection of historical records.  It was written in 492–493 by Shen Yue from the Southern Qi dynasty (479–502).

The work contained 100 volumes at the time that it was written, but some volumes were already missing by the time of the Song Dynasty.  Later editors reconstructed those volumes by taking material from the History of the Southern Dynasties, plus a few works such as the Historiette of Gao by Gao Jun, though many of those volumes were no longer in their original condition.

History
The Book of Song was based on records compiled beginning in the Liu Song. He Chentian 何承天 (370-447) was commissioned by the imperial court of the time in 439.  He compiled biographies and also treatises on astronomy and music. Compilation was later continued by Shan Qianzhi 山謙之 (fl. 440-456), and Xu Yuan 徐爰 (394-475).  The Qi court commissioned Shen Yue in 487 to complete the Book of Song.

Contents
The first ten juan are annals of the Liu Song emperors, 30 juan contain treatises, and 60 juan are dedicated to biographies.

Translations
There are no known full translations to English. Dien includes partial translations of The Disputation at Pengcheng, a conflict in present-day Xuzhou. Dien compares the Northern Wei and Liu Song accounts of this one in a long series of conflicts between the two states. The Liu Song account is included in volume 59 of the Book of Song. Holcombe translates a fragment of volume 54 on a land petition.

References

External links 

 Book of Song 《宋書》 Chinese text with matching English vocabulary

History books about the Northern and Southern dynasties
Southern and Northern Dynasties literature
Twenty-Four Histories
5th-century history books
Liu Song dynasty
Sixteen Kingdoms
5th-century Chinese books